Haka Life is a New Zealand reality television show that airs on Māori Television and which premiered on 22 March 2017. The show focuses on the Māori group Ngā Tūmanako as they prepare for Te Matatini 2017.

Cast
Main
 Kawariki Morgan - Male Tutor / member of the group.
 Kym Morgan - Women's Tutor / member of the group.
 Reikura Kahi - Tutor
 Marama Gardiner - Head Of Singing

Production 
The show was announced during an interview at Te Matatini 2017. The promo was released in March 2017. The show premiered on 22 March 2017. The season finale aired on 3 May 2017.

References

External links
 Website
Television in New Zealand
New Zealand reality television series
2017 New Zealand television series debuts